The Runaway Bunny is an animated television special by HBO Max based on the children's book of the same name, that premiered on March 25, 2021. The program is directed and produced by Amy Schatz, and narrated by Tracee Ellis Ross. It features music by Mariah Carey, Rosanne Cash, Kimya Dawson, Michael Kiwanuka, Ziggy Marley, Kelly Rowland, and Rufus Wainwright.

The special was removed from HBO Max in August 2022.

Reception
Common Sense Media rated the show 4 out of 5 stars.

Sam Thielman, writing for NBC News, said, "HBO Max's 'The Runaway Bunny' is emotionally intense, beautiful and abstract. My kid loved it."

References

External links 
  

2021 television specials
2020s American television specials
2021 in animation
2020s animated television specials
HBO Max original programming
Children's television